Fast wia im richtigen Leben is a German television series.

See also
List of German television series

External links
 

1979 German television series debuts
1988 German television series endings
German comedy television series
Television shows set in Bavaria
German-language television shows
Das Erste original programming
Grimme-Preis for fiction winners